Statistics of Guam League in the 2004 season.

Overview
Guam U-18 won the championship.

References
RSSSF

Guam Soccer League seasons
Guam
Guam
football